Elena Kunitskaya (died 1684), was a Ukrainian Hetmana by marriage to Stefan Kunicki, Hetman of Ukraine (r. 1672-1684).  She was an influential figure among the Ukrainian Cossacks.  She is known as a valuable political adviser to her spouse and for an act of military evacuation which caused the rival hetman to attempt to abduct her.

References

1684 deaths
17th-century Ukrainian people
People from the Cossack Hetmanate
Women in 17th-century warfare
Year of birth unknown
Date of death unknown